Hanover Township is one of thirteen townships Butler County, Ohio, United States. It is located in the west-central part of the county, midway between Hamilton and Oxford. The population of the township was 8,111 at the 2020 census. It is named for Hanover County, Virginia, where the early settlers originated.

History
The twelfth in order of creation, Hanover Township was established from Ross and St. Clair townships by the Butler County Commissioners on December 2, 1811.

Geography
About half the village of Millville is in Hanover Township (the remainder is in Ross Township). The unincorporated community of McGonigle lies in the township's northwest.

Located in the center of the county, it borders the following townships:
Milford Township - north
Wayne Township - northeast
St. Clair Township - east
Ross Township - south
Morgan Township - southwest
Reily Township - west
Oxford Township - northwest

Government
The township is governed by a three-member board of trustees, who are elected in November of odd-numbered years to a four-year term beginning on the following January 1. Two are elected in the year after the presidential election and one is elected in the year before it. There is also an elected township fiscal officer, who serves a four-year term beginning on April 1 of the year after the election, which is held in November of the year before the presidential election. Vacancies in the fiscal officership or on the board of trustees are filled by the remaining trustees.

Transportation
In the nineteenth century, the Cincinnati, Hamilton, and Dayton Railroad's Richmond division crossed the township en route from Hamilton with a station at McGonigle. This line, still active, is now part of CSX Transportation.

Major highways are U.S. Route 27, which links Cincinnati to Richmond via Millville and Oxford through the western third of the township; State Route 177, which links Hamilton and Richmond, across the northeast section of the township; State Route 130, which links U.S. 27 and State Route 177 through the center of the township; and State Route 129, which crosses the southeast from Hamilton to Millville.

Schools
Most of the township is in the Talawanda City School District, which was formed by the merger of the Oxford, Hanover, Milford, and Somerville school districts in 1953.  However, parts of the township are in three other districts.  The Ross Local includes a section on the southern border, the Hamilton City includes territory in the southeast adjacent to the city of Hamilton, and the Edgewood City has a small piece of the township's northeast corner.

References

Further reading
Bert S. Barlow, W.H. Todhunter, Stephen D. Cone, Joseph J. Pater, and Frederick Schneider, eds.  Centennial History of Butler County, Ohio.  Hamilton, Ohio:  B.F. Bowen, 1905.
Jim Blount.  The 1900s:  100 Years In the History of Butler County, Ohio.  Hamilton, Ohio:  Past Present Press, 2000.
Butler County Engineer's Office.  Butler County Official Transportation Map, 2003.  Fairfield Township, Butler County, Ohio:  The Office, 2003.
A History and Biographical Cyclopaedia of Butler County, Ohio with Illustrations and Sketches of Its Representative Men and Pioneers.  Cincinnati, Ohio:  Western Biographical Publishing Company, 1882. 
Ohio. Secretary of State.  The Ohio municipal and township roster, 2002-2003.  Columbus, Ohio:  The Secretary, 2003.

External links
Township website
County website

Townships in Butler County, Ohio
1811 establishments in Ohio
Populated places established in 1811
Townships in Ohio